The FIBA AmeriCup Top Scorer is a FIBA award that is given every four years (previously every two years), to the leading scorer of the FIBA AmeriCup tournament.

Top scorers

References

External links
FIBA Americas official website

Top Scorer
Basketball trophies and awards